CAMS or cams may refer to:

Organizations
 Chinese Academy of Medical Sciences
 California Academy of Mathematics and Science, a high school in Carson, California, US
 Calexico Mission School, a Seventh-day Adventist Church school, California, US
 Center for Advanced Media Studies, Johns Hopkins University
 Chantiers Aéro-Maritimes de la Seine, a French aircraft manufacturer of the 1920s and 1930s
 Coalition Against Militarism in Our Schools in the United States
 Copernicus Atmosphere Monitoring Service (CAMS)
 Motorsport Australia, formerly the Confederation of Australian Motor Sport, the national sporting organisation vested with the authority to conduct motor sport in Australia by the FIA
 Cameras for All-Sky Meteor Surveillance, a project from the SETI Institute that tracks meteor showers globally

Other uses
 Camshafts, which can be found on Internal combustion engines
 Spring-loaded camming device or cams, a piece of rock climbing or mountaineering protection equipment
 Cell adhesion molecules

See also
 Cam (disambiguation)
 Child and Adolescent Mental Health Services (CAMHS)